Zanolini is an Italian surname. Notable people with the surname include:

Danilo Zanolini (born 1980), Brazilian kickboxer
Gualtiero Zanolini, member of the World Scout Committee
Paul Zanolini (1898–1989), American sport wrestler
Umberto Zanolini (1887–1973), Italian gymnast

Italian-language surnames
Patronymic surnames
Surnames from given names